Soyuz 26 (Union 26) was a Soviet space mission which launched the crew of Salyut 6 EO-1, the first long duration crew on the space station Salyut 6.

The Soyuz spacecraft was launched on 10 December 1977, and docked with the space station the next day. Soyuz 27 arrived at the station in January 1978, and its two-person crew transferred into the Soyuz 26 spacecraft to undock and land a few days later.

Crew

Backup crew

Mission parameters
Mass: 
Perigee: 
Apogee: 
Inclination: 51.65°
Period: 88.67 minutes

References

Crewed Soyuz missions
1977 in the Soviet Union
Spacecraft launched in 1977
Spacecraft which reentered in 1978
Spacecraft launched by Soyuz-U rockets